Benjamin T. Richardson,  (born 21 September 1975) is an English cinematographer, television producer and director. He is best known for his work on the films Beasts of the Southern Wild (2012), The Fault in Our Stars (2014), Wind River (2017), and Those Who Wish Me Dead (2021), as well as the limited series Mare of Easttown (2021), which earned him a Primetime Emmy Award nomination.

Early life
Richardson was born in England and attended Bournemouth school succeeded by Royal Holloway, University of London's media arts degree programme.

Career
Richardson is a director of photography. Three of his films, Beasts of the Southern Wild, Happy Christmas, and Wind River have premiered at the Sundance Film Festival. Beasts of the Southern Wild was also nominated for four Academy Awards at the 85th Academy Awards, including a nomination for Best Picture. His short film Seed won Best Animated Short at the 2010 Slamdance Film Festival.

In 2019, Richardson was invited to join the American Society of Cinematographers.

Beasts of the Southern Wild
Richardson met director Benh Zeitlin in Prague in 2004 and subsequently collaborated on the short film Glory at Sea in 2008. During pre-production on Beasts of the Southern Wild, Richardson shot a test reel which convinced the financiers to approve him as cinematographer for the film.

Beasts of the Southern Wild debuted at the 2012 Sundance Film Festival where Richardson won the Excellence in Cinematography Award. For his work on the film he also won the Independent Spirit Award for Best Cinematography, and was nominated for multiple awards including a Camerimage award and a Satellite Award.

Personal life
Richardson had been a relationship with actress Anna Kendrick since 2014 after they met while filming Drinking Buddies.  That relationship ended at an unknown date.

Filmography

Cinematographer
Short films

Film

Television

Director
Short films

Television

References

External links
Official website

English cinematographers
English expatriates in the United States
Living people
Place of birth missing (living people)
1975 births